Prilozje is a small settlement in the Municipality of Metlika in the White Carniola area of southeastern Slovenia. The area is part of the traditional region of Lower Carniola and is now included in the Southeast Slovenia Statistical Region.

A small airfield, mainly for gliders and light aircraft, is located west of the village.

References

External links

Prilozje on Geopedia

Populated places in the Municipality of Metlika